Billy Boslem (born 11 January 1958) is an English former footballer who played as a defender.

References

1958 births
Living people
English footballers
Association football defenders
Rochdale A.F.C. players
English Football League players